Ofer Fleisher (עופר פליישר; born March 14, 1966, in Ramat Gan, Israel) is an Israeli former basketball player who played the center position. Fleisher played in the Israeli Basketball Premier League and for the Israeli national basketball team.

Biography

Fleisher played the center position, and is 2.08m (6 ft 10 in) tall.

Fleisher played  in the Israeli Basketball Premier League for Hapoel Tel Aviv, Hapoel Holon, Hapoel Galil Elyon, Ramat Hasharon, Maccabi Haifa, Ramat Gan, Bnei Herzelia, and Maccabi Netanya. He played for the Israeli national basketball team in the 1987 European Championship for Men, 1988 European Olympic Qualifying Tournament for Men, 1992 European Olympic Qualifying Tournament for Men, 1993 European Championship for Men, 1995 European Championship for Men, 1997 European Championship for Men, and 1999 European Championship for Men.

References 

Living people
1966 births
Israeli men's basketball players
Hapoel Tel Aviv B.C. players
Hapoel Holon players
Hapoel Gilboa Galil Elyon players
Maccabi Haifa B.C. players
Ironi Ramat Gan players
Israeli Basketball Premier League players
People from Ramat Gan